The Cleveland Buddhist Temple is a Pure Land (Jodo Shinshu) community currently meeting at the Unitarian Universalist Congregation of Cleveland in Shaker Heights, Ohio. It traces its beginnings to 1944, and is at its current location since April, 2018. The current Supervising Minister is Rev. Ron Miyamura with the assistance of Tokudo Ministers. Cleveland Buddhist Temple is affiliated with the Buddhist Churches of America (BCA), which is part of the Nishi Hongwanji tradition headquartered in Kyoto, Japan

History
Japanese-Americans founded the center in the mid-1940s, and after the first temple was destroyed during the Hough Riots in 1966, it relocated to Euclid, OH in 1970, a suburb of Cleveland. The Euclid building was sold in 2018 and the congregation's meetings and classes presently take place the weekend of the third Sunday of every month at space rented in the Unitarian Universalist Congregation of Cleveland in Shaker Heights. 

After some decline, membership saw an increase after Koshin Ogui arrived at the temple as minister in 1977.  He created a new group, Zen Shin Sangha, which helped increase the appeal of the temple. The Cleveland Buddhist temple is currently reorganizing its activities, including meditation, but re-focusing on Jodo Shinshu Buddhism at its new location.

References

External links

Buddhist Churches of America
Buddhist temples in Ohio
1970 in Ohio
Shaker Heights, Ohio
2018 in Ohio